Big Girls Don't Cry is an album by American music duo The Weather Girls, released in 1985. It was the group's final album on Columbia Records,. The music drew on influences from 1960's sounds. It was less successful than its predecessor, Success (1983).

Critical reception

Writing for AllMusic, Ron Wynn gave a mixed review to the record, describing the songs on it as "formula pop-soul and dance filler." Wynn also stated that group "never really were allowed to showcase their real personalities or styles." Music critic Robert Christgau thought that the duo "takes it one step further and make soul a cartoon, with the title cut the masterstroke." Christgau further commented: "They'll cop material anywhere--debut single's from Jesse Winchester. And if at first their tricks seem inspired, by the time you get to Creedence and Neil Sedaka they're beginning to sound obvious."

Track listing
 "Lock Me Up" (Doug James, Michael Bolton) – 4:16
 "Big Girls Don't Cry" (Bob Crewe, Bob Gaudio) – 3:25
 "Well-A-Wiggy" (Jesse Winchester) – 4:31
 "No One Can Love You More Than Me" (Terry Britten, Billy Livsey) – 4:55
 "Down on the Corner" (John Fogerty) – 3:56
 "March" (Peter Zizzo) – 3:39
 "Laughter in the Rain" (Neil Sedaka, Phil Cody) – 3:15
 "You Can Do It" (Evie Sands, Richard Germinaro, Ben Weisman) – 4:28

Personnel
The Weather Girls 
Izora Armstead - lead vocals
Martha Wash - lead vocals
Musicians
Elliott Randall, Georg Wadenius, Scott Zito - electric guitar
Elliott Randall, Jesse Winchester - acoustic guitar
David Sanborn - alto saxophone
Gregg Mangiafico - synthesizer programming
 Leon Pendarvis – acoustic piano, drum and synthesizer programming, arrangements
Sammy Merendino - drum programming
Jimmy Maelen - additional percussion
Carl Hall, Izora Armstead, Martha Wash, Ula Hedwig - backing vocals
Technical
 Joe Venneri – audio engineering, associate producer, mixing
 Jeff Kent – producer, mixing
 Hank Medress – producer
 Charles Koppelman – executive producer
John Berg - art direction
Gary Heery - photography

References

External links
 

1985 albums
Columbia Records albums
Albums produced by Charles Koppelman
The Weather Girls albums